Rosewood is an unincorporated community and census-designated place (CDP) in northwestern Adams Township, Champaign County, Ohio, United States. As of the 2020 census it had a population of 224. It has a post office with the ZIP code 43070. It lies along State Route 29, an east–west highway.

Rosewood was laid out and platted in 1893 when the railroad was extended to that point. A post office has been in operation at Rosewood since 1894.

References

Census-designated places in Ohio
Census-designated places in Champaign County, Ohio